The 1898-99 season was the seventh season in Liverpool F.C.'s existence, and was their sixth year in The Football League, in which they competed in the first division. The season covers the period from 1 July 1898 to 30 June 1899.

References

External links
LFC History Season 1898-99
1898–99 Liverpool F.C.Results
LFC Kit 1898-99

1898-1899
English football clubs 1898–99 season